The Flora of Cape Verde includes the flowers and plants of Cape Verde, mostly native to the islands. There are about 240 species of plants.
[[File:Nauplius smithii.jpg|thumb|right|350px|Asteriscus smithii (Nauplius smithii), an endemic plant]]

About the flora
In the process of development, many lands in the islands were converted to agricultural fields and several hundred varieties of herbaceous plant and tree species were introduced, resulting in depletion of the original vegetation. However, efforts are now underway at reforestation to improve the wildlife of Cape Verde, with reported planting of three million new trees every year (about 7000 per day), with pine, oak, sweet chestnut and acacia as the prominent varieties being planted. Cape Verde is also one of the world's top ten coral reef Biodiversity hotspots.

Historically, Cape Verde was probably not rich with greenery, although the evidence of the situation in earlier times is severely lacking. When Cape Verde was first discovered and colonized by the Portuguese in the 15th century, the wildlife consisted mainly of dry forests and scrub habitat, which underwent a sea change under the influence of the inhabitants of this then isolated and uninhabited group of islands. The endemic flora and fauna of the islands were disturbed and have now remained confined mostly in the mountain peaks, steep slopes and other inaccessible areas.
Vegetation in the islands is basically of the savannah or steppe type. There are trees typical of both temperate and tropical climates, depending on elevation. The flatter parts of the islands sustain semi-desert plants while the higher lands have arid shrubland. The leeward slopes tend to contain desert, with a very sparse shrub cover,  mostly thorny or toxic. A number of xerophilous plants grow in the brackish subsoil of Maio, Sal, and Boa Vista.

There are 664 listed plant species, which include two threatened species. Over 80 vascular plant taxa are reported to be endemic to Cape Verde; these include Tornabenea, Aeonium gorgoneum, Campanula bravensis (bellflower), Asteriscus smithii (Nauplius smithii), Artemisia gorgonum (sagebrush), Sideroxylon marginata, Lotus jacobaeus, Lavandula rotundifolia, Cynanchum daltonii, Euphorbia tuckeyana, Polycarpaea gayi and Erysimum caboverdeanum (wallflower). Several trees are indigenous such as the blue-green flat-topped dragon tree Dracaena draco, Tamarix senegalensis, Phoenix atlantica (tamateira), in the lagoons and deserts of Boavista, the ironwood tree and a species of fig tree and Faidherbia albida (formerly known as Acacia albida and locally called simply "acácia"). As a result of extensive tree planting since 1975, there are pine trees, oaks and sweet chestnuts on the cool peaks of Santo Antao, eucalyptus on the heights of Fogo, and forests of acacia on Maio.

List of endangered flora
Here is a list of endangered flora in Cape Verde, of which 97 are ranked species and 19 are ranked subspecies.  They belong to 62 genera and 28 families.  Of which 50 of them are in the island of Santo Antão, 45 in São Nicolau, 38 in Santiago and 37 in Fogo.  80% of them are in the highlands.

Extinct flora

See also
Wildlife of Cape Verde

References

Sources
Cape Verdean Endemic Plants

Further reading
 Brochmann, C., Rustan, O. H., Lobin, W. & Kilian, N. 1997. The endemic vascular plants of the Cape Verde Islands, W Africa. Sommerfeltia, 24: 1-356. 
 Isildo Gomes et al., Endemic plants and indigenous trees of the Cape Verde islands'', Ministry of Environment, Agriculture and Fishery and the Projects "Conservation and Exploration of the Natural Resources on the Island Fogo" (Deutsche Gesellschaft für Technische Zusammenarbeitand) and « Conservation of Biodiversity », 2003, p. 36
 Duarte, M. C., Rego, F., Romeiras, M. M. & Moreira, I. 2008. Plant species richness in the Cape Verde Islands — eco-geographical determinants. Biodiversity and Conservation, 17: 453–466. 
 Sunding, P. 1973. Endemism in the flora of the Cape Verde Islands, with special emphasis on the macaronesian flora elements. Monogr. Biol. Canar. 4: 112–117.

External links
Cabo Verde // Living National Treasures
Endemic plants of the Cape Verde Islands
Les îles du Cap Vert : géographie, biogéographie, agriculture. Flore de l'archipel. Muséum national d'histoire naturelle, laboratoire d'agronomie coloniale, Paris 1935. (available on pdf via Tela Botanica) 
Endemic Plants and Indigenous Trees of Cape Verde (Plantas endémicas e árvores indígenas de Cabo Verde)